Uttarpara Kotrung Municipality is the civic body that governs Uttarpara Kotrung and its surrounding areas (Bhadrakali and Hind Motor) in Srirampore subdivision of Hooghly district, West Bengal, India. It's the oldest municipality in the state of West Bengal.

History
Uttarpara Municipality was founded on 14 April 1853 after the second appeal by zamindar Joykrishna and others for a municipality to the Government of Bengal, the first appeal made by them in 1851 was rejected. Uttarpara was only the second town in Bengal to voluntarily adopt the Municipal Act of 1850 Sec XX16 – Serampore was the first town to adopt it. However, while in Serampore European residents pushed the issue through, in Uttarpara it was the zamindar Joy Krishna Mukherjee who played the pivotal role and made Uttarpara Municipality the first in the state by establishing it in 1853, 12 years before Serampore Municipality and 23 years before Kolkata Municipal Corporation. Kotrung was merged with Uttarapara Municipality in 1964 and it was renamed Uttarpara Kotrung Municipality. Makhla was merged with Uttarpara Kotrung Municipality in 1991.

Geography

The boundaries of Uttarpara Kotrung Municipality are as follows: Konnagar Municipality to the north, Hooghly River to the east and Bally Khal to the south. Earlier the railway track was the western limit, but subsequently areas such as Makhla and Hindmotor have been added beyond the railway track.

Uttarpara Kotrung Municipality covers an area of 11.75 sq km and has a population of 159,413 (2011).

In 1981, 27.47% of the total population formed main workers and 72.53% were non-workers in Uttarpara Kotrung  Municipality and 37.98% of the total main workers were industrial workers. This may be interpreted as follows: although industrial activities are prominent in the municipal areas of the region, the major portion of the population is commuters and migrants find employment in the area.

Healthcare
Uttarpara General Hospital, with 204 beds, Female Vagrants Home and primary health centre with 5 beds at Bhadrakali are located in the Uttarpara Kotrung Municipality area.

Elections
In the 2015 municipal elections for Uttarpara Kotrung municipality Trinamool Congress won 15 seats, CPI(M) 4 seats, Congress 2 seats and Independents 3 seats.

In the 2010 municipal elections for Uttarpara Kotrung  Municipality Trinamool Congress won 22 seats, CPI (M) 1 seat and Independent 1 seat.

Wards
Details of the wards, with 2022 municipal election results, are as follows:

This is a broad indication of the neighbourhood covered, not a full description.

References

 

Municipalities of West Bengal